Yves André Goursolle (6 August 1931 – 18 May 2014) was a French rower. He competed in the men's coxed four event at the 1952 Summer Olympics.

References

1931 births
2014 deaths
French male rowers
Olympic rowers of France
Rowers at the 1952 Summer Olympics